Wycliffe Nathaniel "Bubba" Morton (December 13, 1931 – January 14, 2006) was an American right fielder in Major League Baseball who played for the Detroit Tigers (1961–1963), Milwaukee Braves (1963) and California Angels (1966–1969).

A native of Washington, D.C., Morton graduated from Armstrong High School in 1950 and later graduated from Howard University. He also has a stint in the United States Coast Guard.

In 1955 Morton became the third black player signed by the Detroit Tigers (though others beat him to the major leagues), one of the first black men to play for the post-war Terre Haute franchise of the Three-I League in 1956, and one of the first black men to play for the Durham Bulls. With the Bulls in 1957, he batted .310 with 18 home runs and 82 runs batted in to lead the club to their first Carolina League championship.

A light-hitting, strong-armed outfielder, Morton played with the Tigers as a reserve in parts of three seasons. He was purchased by the Milwaukee Braves from Detroit in the 1963 mid-season. During his brief tenure with the Braves, he was the roommate of Hank Aaron. The next two years Morton played at Triple-A for the Milwaukee Braves and Cleveland Indians organizations, until he was acquired by the California Angels at the end of the 1965 season.

Morton saw considerable action with the Angels between 1966 and 1969. A prime pinch-hitter, his best season was 1967, when he hit .313 in 80 games. During the same period he committed only one error in 251 chances in the outfield.

In a seven-season career, Morton was a .267 hitter with 14 home runs and 128 RBI in 451 games. He finished his career with a .989 fielding percentage.

In the middle of his major league career, Morton was a member of the Seattle Angels team that won the Pacific Coast League pennant in 1966. He played with the Angels through 1969, then moved to Japan to play the 1970 season with the Toei Flyers.

In 1972, Morton was hired by athletics director Joe Kearney as head coach of the baseball program at the University of Washington (UW) from 1972 to 1976. He is distinguished as UW's first black head coach in any sport.

After his retirement from baseball, Morton worked for Boeing and was a retired Coast Guard reservist. 
 
Morton died in Seattle, Washington, at the age of 74.

References

External links

Baseball Reference (Minors)
Bubba Morton - Baseballbiography.com
Seattle Times
Venezuelan Baseball League

1931 births
2006 deaths
African-American baseball players
American expatriate baseball players in Japan
United States Coast Guard enlisted
United States Coast Guard reservists
Augusta Tigers players
Baseball players from Washington, D.C.
California Angels players
Charleston Senators players
Denver Bears players
Detroit Tigers players
Durham Bulls players
Howard Bison baseball players
Idaho Falls Russets players
Industriales de Valencia players
Jamestown Falcons players
Lancaster Red Roses players
Major League Baseball right fielders
Milwaukee Braves players
People from Washington, D.C.
Portland Beavers players
Seattle Angels players
Terre Haute Tigers players
Tigres de Aragua players
American expatriate baseball players in Venezuela
Toei Flyers players
Toronto Maple Leafs (International League) players
Washington Huskies baseball coaches
20th-century African-American sportspeople
21st-century African-American people